Emmett Cary Middlecoff (January 6, 1921 – September 1, 1998) was an American professional golfer on the PGA Tour from 1947 to 1961. His 39 Tour wins place him tied for tenth all-time, and he won three major championships. Middlecoff graduated as a dentist, but gave up his practice at age 26 to become a full-time Tour golfer.

Early life and education
Middlecoff was born January 6, 1921, in Halls, Tennessee. He graduated from Christian Brothers High School. He played collegiate golf at the University of Mississippi, becoming that school's first golf All-American in 1939. First as an undergraduate and active member of Kappa Alpha Order, then as a dental student at the University of Tennessee, Middlecoff won the Tennessee State Amateur Championship for four straight years (1940–1943). After obtaining his Doctor of Dental Surgery (DDS) degree in 1944, he entered the United States Army Dental Corps during World War II. He won a PGA Tour tournament as an amateur in 1945, and then turned professional in 1947. He was selected for the 1947 Walker Cup team but immediately withdrew as he intended turning professional.

PGA Tour career
During his playing career, Middlecoff won 39 PGA Tour tournaments, including the 1955 Masters and U.S. Open titles in 1949 and 1956. He won the Vardon Trophy for lowest scoring average in 1956.

Middlecoff played on three Ryder Cup teams: 1953, 1955, and 1959 – the U.S. teams won all three times. He was ineligible for the 1957 Ryder Cup because he failed to play in the PGA Championship that year. Middlecoff was disappointed to lose a playoff in the 1957 U.S. Open to Dick Mayer, and played very few events following that event. The U.S. lost the Cup in 1957, for the first time since 1933.

Middlecoff's three best seasons were 1949, 1951 and 1956, as he won six tour titles in each of those years. He won at least one tour tournament in 13 of his 15 seasons, missing only in 1957 and 1960.

During the decade of the 1950s, Middlecoff won 28 tour titles, more than any other player during that span. A tall player with plenty of power and very good accuracy, Middlecoff during his best years was also a superb putter. He was known for often taking excessive time to play his shots.

Back problems and struggles with his nerves during competition ended his career in the early 1960s, when he was in his early 40s, although he continued to play occasionally, competing in the Masters until 1971, as a past champion.

Middlecoff became a top player despite having one leg slightly shorter than the other.

Movies, television and writing
Middlecoff later developed a reputation as one of the best of the early golf television commentators. After retiring from the tour, he spent 18 years as a golf analyst for television. He appeared in two motion pictures as himself (Follow the Sun (1951, about the life and career of Ben Hogan) and The Bellboy (1960)). He wrote a newspaper column, "The Golf Doctor." He also appeared in a short biographical sports documentary Golf Doctor (1947).

Later life
In 1986, Middlecoff was inducted into the World Golf Hall of Fame. He died of heart disease in 1998 in Memphis, Tennessee. He was survived by his wife of 51 years, Edith.

Professional wins (41)

PGA Tour wins (39)

*Mangrum and Middlecoff agreed to share the 1949 Motor City Open after failing light caused play to halt after eleven holes of a playoff.

PGA Tour playoff record (7–6–1)

Sources:

Other wins (1)
this list may be incomplete
1949 Greenbrier Pro-Am

Major championships

Wins (3)

Results timeline

LA = Low amateur
CUT = missed the half-way cut
WD = withdrew
R32, R16, QF, SF = Round in which player lost in PGA Championship match play
"T" = tied

Summary

Most consecutive cuts made – 12 (1948 Masters – 1953 Masters)
Longest streak of top-10s – 3 (twice)

U.S. national team appearances
Professional
Ryder Cup: 1953 (winners), 1955 (winners), 1959 (winners)
Canada Cup: 1959
Hopkins Trophy: 1952 (winners), 1955 (winners), 1956 (winners)

See also

List of golfers with most PGA Tour wins

References

External links

American male golfers
Ole Miss Rebels men's golfers
PGA Tour golfers
Winners of men's major golf championships
Ryder Cup competitors for the United States
World Golf Hall of Fame inductees
Golf writers and broadcasters
Golfers from Memphis, Tennessee
United States Army personnel of World War II
University of Tennessee alumni
People from Halls, Tennessee
1921 births
1998 deaths